Metarbela chidzingai is a moth in the family Cossidae. It is found in Tanzania. The habitat consists of lowland and submontane woodlands.

The length of the forewings is about 10.5 mm. The forewings are deep colonial buff with a light brownish olive terminal line and small light brownish olive triangles along the termen. The subterminal line light is brownish olive. The hindwings are colonial buff to ecru-olive.

Etymology
The species is named for Saidi Ali Chidzinga of the Coastal Forest Conservation Unit.

References

Natural History Museum Lepidoptera generic names catalog

Endemic fauna of Tanzania
Metarbelinae
Moths described in 2008